Hems may refer to:

Homs, Syria
Air Ambulance - HEMS: Helicopter Emergency Medical Service
EMS - HEMS: Home Energy Management Systems
Mangalore Airport (Victoria), IATA airport code "HEMS"

See also
Hem